Serge Honi (born 11 September 1973, in Douala) is a retired Cameroonian footballer who played as a forward.

He spent most of his 11-year professional career in Greece, representing eight different clubs.

Club career
Honi began playing football with Canon Yaoundé. He started his professional career with C.F. Os Belenenses in the Portuguese top division, appearing in only five scoreless games during his only season, and going on loan to F.C. Famalicão in the second level for the following season.

Honi moved to Greece in July 1995, initially joining first division side Larissa F.C. for one season. However, he left for level two side Naoussa F.C. in January of the following year, spending the following season with PAS Giannina F.C. and Ethnikos Piraeus FC, also in division two.

The next season, still in the same country, Honi played for Panelefsiniakos FC (second level). After three seasons in Cyprus, he returned to Greece and played for Kastoria F.C. in the fourth division. After another season in the same category with Chalida FC, he joined third division side Thrasyvoulos FC.

Honi retired from football in June 2004, at the age of 30.

International career
Honi played twice for Cameroon, both his appearances coming in 1994.

References

External links

1973 births
Living people
Footballers from Douala
Cameroonian footballers
Association football forwards
Canon Yaoundé players
Primeira Liga players
C.F. Os Belenenses players
F.C. Famalicão players
Super League Greece players
Athlitiki Enosi Larissa F.C. players
PAS Giannina F.C. players
Ethnikos Piraeus F.C. players
Kastoria F.C. players
Thrasyvoulos F.C. players
Alki Larnaca FC players
Naoussa F.C. players
Olympiakos Nicosia players
AEK Larnaca FC players
Cypriot First Division players
Cameroon international footballers
Cameroonian expatriate footballers
Expatriate footballers in Portugal
Expatriate footballers in Greece
Expatriate footballers in Cyprus
Panelefsiniakos F.C. players